Cheshmeh-ye Shirin Rashnow (also Romanized as Cheshmeh-ye Shīrīn Rashnow; also known as Cheshmeh Shīrīn) is a village in Murmuri Rural District, Kalat District, Abdanan County, Ilam Province, Iran. At the 2006 census, its population was 120, in 18 families. The village is populated by Kurds.

References 

Populated places in Abdanan County
Kurdish settlements in Ilam Province